The 1st NWHL All-Star Game took place on January 24, 2016 at HarborCenter in Buffalo, New York. The event featured two 20-minute periods in a 4-on-4 format and a Skills Competition. Team Pfalzer entered the game with a 4-0 lead having won all events in the Skills Competition.

This edition of the All-Star Game featured a "fantasy draft" format in order to determine the rosters. The team captains were Hilary Knight from the Boston Pride, and forward Emily Pfalzer, also a team captain with the Buffalo Beauts. Team Knight had the first pick overall and selected Kacey Bellamy. The captains each chose 11 players for their team.

Draft

Each captain had to select at least one player from all four teams in the NWHL. In addition, each captain had to select two goalies among their 11 selections. Two available spots on each team were determined by fan balloting, which took place from December 11–14, 2015, with winning players announced on December 15.

Fan voting
Over 62,000 votes were cast in order to select four more players to add to the All-Star Game rosters. Madison Packer and Hayley Williams were assigned to Team Knight, while Morgan Fritz-Ward and Devon Skeat shall suit up with Team Pfalzer.

Game summary
The starting goaltenders in the contest were Nana Fujimoto for Team Pfalzer and Jaimie Leonoff for Team Knight.

Kelley Steadman would score the first goal in All-Star Game history, providing Team Pfalzer with the lead, as Leonoff allowed said goal. Earning the assists on Steadman's historic goal was Meghan Duggan. Adding to Team Pfalzer's lead was Emily Field, who would also score on Leonoff in the first.

In the second period, Brianne McLaughlin would replace Leonoff for Team Knight, while Brittany Ott stood between the pipes for Team Pfalzer. Along with Blake Bolden, Field and Kaleigh Fratkin, Ott would become one of four women to have competed in the 2015 Women's Winter Classic and the inaugural NWHL All-Star Game.

Steadman would score on McLaughlin, generating the first multi-goal performance in All-Star Game history. Other Team Pfalzer skaters that would score included Shiann Darkangelo and Devon Skeats, who became the first Canadian to score a goal in the NWHL All-Star Game. During the second, Hayley Williams would score the only goal of the game for Team Knight.

Skills competition
Held prior to the game itself, there were four different skills events. Whichever team would prevail in each event would gain one point that would count towards the All-Star Game's final score. Of note, Team Pfalzer captured the win in all four events at the Skills Competition, gaining four points. In the hardest shot competition, Megan Bozek was the winner, with a shot of 88 mph.

References 

2016 National Womens Hockey League All-Star Game
Tourist attractions in Buffalo, New York
Buffalo Beauts
2016 in ice hockey
2016 in sports in New York (state)
2015–16 NWHL season
Premier Hockey Federation All-Star Games